Paolo Carignani (born 1961) is an Italian conductor.

He has been chief conductor of the Opern- und Schauspielhaus Frankfurt (1997–2008), and season conductor of the Frankfurter Opern- und Museumsorchester.

Selected discography and videography
 Puccini's Tosca with Emily Magee, Jonas Kaufmann and Thomas Hampson for the Zürich Opera 2009, DVD Decca 2011.

References

Italian male conductors (music)
Musicians from Milan
1961 births
Living people
21st-century Italian conductors (music)
21st-century Italian male musicians